The 1999–2000 Liga Artzit season was the first in which Liga Artzit was the third tier of Israeli football due to the formation of the Israeli Premier League. Only the champions, Hapoel Ramat Gan, were promoted as restructuring continued in the divisions above.

Hapoel Ironi Dimona and Hapoel Iksal were relegated to Liga Alef. At the end of the season Beitar Tel Aviv and Shimshon Tel Aviv merged to form Beitar Shimshon Tel Aviv. The spare place in the division was filled by promoting the third-best club from Liga Alef rather than reprieving Hapoel Ironi Dimona.

Final table

References
Israel Third Level 1999/2000 RSSSF

Liga Artzit seasons
3
Israel